During the 2012–13 English football season, Morecambe Football Club competed in Football League Two where they finished in 16th position with 58 points.

Final league table

Results
Morecambe's score comes first

Legend

Football League Two

FA Cup

League Cup

Football League Trophy

Squad statistics

References
General
Morecambe 2012–13 at soccerbase.com (use drop down list to select relevant season)

Specific

Morecambe F.C. seasons
Morecambe